Sardar Muhammad Azam Khan Musakhel was a Pakistani politician who is currently a member of Senate of Pakistan, representing Pakhtunkhwa Milli Awami Party. He died on 15 December 2018.

Political career

He was elected to the Senate of Pakistan as a candidate of Pakhtunkhwa Milli Awami Party in 2015 Pakistani Senate election.

References

2018 deaths
Pakistani senators (14th Parliament)
Year of birth missing